Seok (from a Siberian Turkic word meaning 'bone', e.g. , Kyrgyz and Tuvan ) is an international term for a clan used in Eurasia from the Middle Asia to the Far East. Seok is usually a distinct member of the community; the name implies that its size is smaller than that of a distinct tribe. It is a term for a clan among the Turkic-speaking people in Siberia, Central Asia, and the Far East. 

The term "Seok" designates a distinct ethnical, geographical, or occupational group distinguishable within a community, usually an extract from a separate distinct tribe. Smaller  tend to intermarry and dissolve after a few centuries, or a couple of dozens generations, gaining new ethnic names, but still carrying some elements and proscriptions of their parent , like the incest restrictions. Larger  tend to survive for millennia, carrying their tribal identification and a system of blood and political alliances and enmities. After a separation with a conjugal partner caused by a forced migration, which amounts to a communal divorce, a  would seek and establish a new permanent conjugal partnership, eventually obtaining new cultural, genetical, and linguistical traits, which in ethnological terms constitutes a transition to a new ethnicity.

Sources

Turkic peoples of Asia
Ethnology
Turkic words and phrases